A Deeper Silence (2008) is an album by the American ambient musician Steve Roach.

Concept
A Deeper Silence was created to be unobtrusive and minimal, similar in nature to Structures from Silence and Darkest Before Dawn, and forgoes the more apparent layering, weaving of sound, and subtle shifts in structure that occur in the Immersion series.  The long-form piece, in its entirety, remains in the deeper tonal ranges, and is described by Steve Roach as "billowing...like a big sigh," "breathing," and "infinite in its essence."

Production
Upon completion, A Deeper Silence was played back in "loop mode" for four months in Steve Roach's sleep chamber before being released.

Track listing

Personnel
Steve Roach – synthesizers

References

External links
 A Deeper Silence at SteveRoach.com
 A Deeper Silence at Projekt Records

2008 albums
Steve Roach (musician) albums
Ambient albums by American artists